Arnold Hirtz (2 September 1910 – 1 March 1993) was a Swiss ice hockey player who competed in the 1936 Winter Olympics.

In 1936, he participated with the Swiss ice hockey team in the Winter Olympics tournament.

See also
List of Olympic men's ice hockey players for Switzerland

References

External links
 

1910 births
1993 deaths
Ice hockey players at the 1936 Winter Olympics
Olympic ice hockey players of Switzerland
Swiss ice hockey goaltenders